West Main may refer to:

 West Main District (Louisville), Kentucky
 West Main Elementary School, a public school in Lancaster, Texas

See also
 North Main
 South Main (disambiguation)